Ali Eren Beşerler (born 25 October 1975) is a former Turkish international footballer. He played 170 matches at Süper Lig, from 1994 to 2005.

Career

Gençlerbirliği
Beşerler started his career at hometown club, the capital giant Gençlerbirliği. He played 18 league matches for the club youth team at PAF League (reserve league) in 1992–93 season and 12 league appearances and 2 goals in BAL Ligi for the amateur team. In 1994–95 season he was promoted to first team. At Gençlerbirliği he started to play for Turkey U21 since April 1996 and selected to 1997 Mediterranean Games.

Beşiktaş
He was offered a new 2-year contract by Gençlerbirliği after the tournament, but in October 1997, he was sold to Beşiktaş. He played 5 league matches in the first season, and played as a regular, played 23 starts, and made him received a call-up to national team. He also signed a new 4-year contract with club. With Turkey he played all 6 caps as starter, and helped Turkey qualify for UEFA Euro 2000. But in club level he just played 7 league matches at 1999-2000 and all from September to December, thus not selected to the UEFA Euro 2000 final tournament. In the next 2 seasons he played 39 league matches and all as starter. In his final season, he just played 13 starts and 2 substitutes appearances.

At the beginning of the 2001/2002 season he was recruited by his former coach Nevio Scala to Serie B outfit Genoa and initially signed a 4-year contract at $1 million per year. After the club's doctors identified an issue on his left knee and asked for further tests, Beşerler chose to cancel the contract and return to Beşiktaş instead.

Late career
In August 2003 he signed for Süper Lig newcomer Çaykur Rizespor on free transfer. But he just played 8 league matches. He then played for Kocaelispor at TFF First League, Süper Lig newcomer Akçaabat Sebatspor, Altay at TFF First League, Sivasspor at Süper Lig and lastly for Turgutluspor at TFF Second League.

Honours
Beşiktaş J.K.
Süper Lig: 2002-03

Career statistics

Club statistics

International statistics

References

External links

Profile at TFF

Turkish footballers
Turkey international footballers
Turkey under-21 international footballers
Gençlerbirliği S.K. footballers
Beşiktaş J.K. footballers
Kocaelispor footballers
Akçaabat Sebatspor footballers
Altay S.K. footballers
Sivasspor footballers
Süper Lig players
Association football defenders
Footballers from Ankara
1975 births
Living people
Mediterranean Games silver medalists for Turkey
Competitors at the 1997 Mediterranean Games
Mediterranean Games medalists in football